The Lac Jacques-Cartier massif is the highest mountain range of the Laurentian Mountains range, in the Canadian province of Quebec. Located between the St. Lawrence River and the Saguenay graben, the altitude of its plateau varies between 800 and 900 meters while its highest point, Mount Raoul Blanchard, reaches  of altitude.

Toponymy 
The massif owes its name to the Jacques-Cartier lake, a glacial lake located in its geographic center.

Geography

Location 
The massif roughly covers the entire region of Capitale-Nationale (with the exception of the banks of the St. Lawrence River) as well as the extreme south of the region of Saguenay–Lac-Saint-Jean.

Topography 

The Jacques-Cartier Lake massif is one of the geographical features of the Laurentides mountain range]. With the Valin Mountains, its altitude exceeds by several hundred meters the rest of the peaks of the chain. The presence of hundreds of lakes and a few glacial valleys (such as the Jacques-Cartier River valley) represents another distinctive facet of the massif.

The main peaks are:
 Mount Raoul Blanchard;
 Mount Belle Fontaine;
 Mont de la Québécoise;
 mont François-De Laval;
 Mont Jean-Hubert;
 Montagne des Érables;
  mont Élie;
 Mont Francine-C.-McKenzie;
 Mont du Lac des Cygnes;
 Mont du Dôme;
 Mont du Lac à Moïse;
 mount Apica;
 mountain in Liguori.

This list is incomplete and in several sectors of the territory the altitude exceeds  without having a physiognomy of mount. In addition, not all high peaks have been officially named as a mountain.

Ecosystem 

The massif has an ecosystem boreal that cannot be found elsewhere at this latitude in Quebec. Being part of the domain of white birch fir (sector 5ef), the most common tree species is black spruce. The massif is home to one of the last herds of forest caribou in southern Quebec, the Charlevoix herd.

History

Environmental protection 
The massif is one of the last wilderness areas in southern Quebec. Almost entirely public territory, it is covered among others by the Laurentides Wildlife Reserve, Jacques-Cartier National Park, Grands-Jardins National Park and Hautes-Gorges-de-la-Rivière-Malbaie National Park.

See also 

 Laurentians (mountains)
 Lac-Jacques-Cartier
 List of mountains of Quebec

References 

Mountains of Quebec
Landforms of Capitale-Nationale
Landforms of Saguenay–Lac-Saint-Jean
Laurentides Wildlife Reserve